Dia de los Muertos is an American metal band formed in Los Angeles, California in 2005.

History
The band was founded by Andres Jaramillo and Alfonso Pinzón of Agony, and Vincent Price of Body Count, as a side project. Since they could not find an official singer for the band, they asked a few musicians to write lyrics and record vocals over their music.

Their first release Day of the Dead EP was recorded at Dungeon Studios in Los Angeles, mixed by Roy Z and released on Cinismo records in 2005, featuring vocals by Tony Campos (Static-X, Asesino, Ministry, Prong - also known as Maldito X), Andres Gimenez (A.N.I.M.A.L.), Loana dP Valencia (Dreams of Damnation), Alex Oquendo (Masacre), Alfonso Pinzón and Vincent Price. Dia De Los Muertos performed at the world's largest 'free of charge' rock festival Rock Al Parque in 2006 with Fear Factory and Death by Stereo.

The latest album Satanico-Dramatico was released electronically for free in March 2011, featuring Adrian Villanueva (Engrave) on guitar, Alejandro  (Sin Salida, El Sagrado) on bass, once again mixed by Roy Z, guests vocals by Jeff Walker, Maldito X, Scott Carlson, Anton Reisenegger, Andres Gimenez, Boris Bonillo and a special appearance from Jonny Coffin on guitar in the instrumental title-track.

After performing several local shows in Los Angeles during 2010 and 2011, the band embarked in the first Mexico Tour, which included Mexico City, Morelia, Querétaro and San Luis Potosí. The band returned to Mexico in May 2012 to play at Eyescream Metal Fest in the famous Circo Volador, sharing the stage with Brutal Truth, Tankard and Voivod.

But it was 2013 the year filled with international shows, as the band's first Latin American Tour took DDLM to The Metal Fest in Santiago (Chile), Teatro Flores in Buenos Aires (Argentina) (opening for Carcass), Hell & Heaven Metal Fest in Guadalajara (Mexico), Del Putas Fest in Medellin (Colombia). The band then returned to Mexico for a second leg in the north-west, then headed to Europe to play Resurrection Fest in Spain, and closed the touring cycle with performances in Mexico City and Morelia for the Day of the Dead celebrations.

DDLM was scheduled to perform at Hell & Heaven Metal Fest 2014 in Mexico City, and "No Money - No Fiesta", the band's second EP, was released in May 2014. A video by feature film and music video director Thomas Mignone was shot for the track "Cantina Del Infierno" in Los Angeles, featuring Morbid Angel vocalist David Vincent as the "El Diablo" character and an appearance by Metal Sanaz.

References

External links
 Official website
 Cantina Del Infierno

Musical groups established in 2005
Musical groups from Los Angeles
Heavy metal musical groups from California